Mohinder Goyal is an Indian politician and a member of the Sixth Legislative Assembly of Delhi in India. He represents the Rithala constituency of New Delhi and is a member of the Aam Aadmi Party political party.

Early life and education
Mohinder  Goyal was born in Kaithal. He attended the Hindu School in Kaithal and is educated till tenth grade.

Political career
Mohinder Goyal has been a MLA for one term. He represented the Rithala constituency and is a member of the Aam Aadmi Party political party.

Member of the Legislative Assembly
Between 2015-2020 he is the Member of the Sixth Legislative Assembly of Delhi. Since 2020 he is the Member of the Seventh Legislative Assembly of Delhi.

Electoral performance

See also
Delhi Legislative Assembly
Rithala (Delhi Assembly constituency)
Sixth Legislative Assembly of Delhi
Delhi Legislative Assembly
Politics of India
Aam Aadmi Party

References 
 

1963 births
Aam Aadmi Party politicians
Delhi MLAs 2015–2020
Delhi MLAs 2020–2025
Living people
People from New Delhi